Kali Bair is an old village situated in the suburbs of Nankana Sahib city, Punjab province, Pakistan. On the world map the location of the village comes at 31’24’16.19’’N and 73’44’54.62’’E (Google Maps). Kali Bair word  refers to a black hackberry tree which is usually not black. Kali means Black and Bair means hackberry or nettle tree. Arabic word for Bair is Sidrah. There was a black hackberry (Bair) tree here which is rare to find in any area. That’s why the place started to be known by that very tree. Formerly it had been in the jurisdiction of Sheikhupura district, however during the presidential period of Pervez Musharraf, Nankana Sahib was promoted from Tehsil level to a district. Now the village has been announced to be the part of the municipal corporation.

History
 In the 19th century there was only one clan called Waseer living here (in the current Nankana Sahib District). They had more than 700 acres of land in their possession. A Hindu cast Khatri also lived in the area as it has been populated by Muslims, Sikhs and Hindus before the Partition of India. In the late 19th century another clan (Bhatti) came there with their cattle and families. They were on the run as they had been convicted of murder in their native village Shamkay Bhatiyan (in Lahore district). They purchased some land from the already living there Waseer community. Thus was constituted most of the present form of the village with two major clans, Wasseers and Bhattis – though Bhattis now outnumber the Waseers.

Major clans
There are two major clans in the village, “Bhatti clan” and “Waseer clan”. They are in majority. However, certain other clans also complement the population of the village. “Syed”, “Awan”, “Kharal”, “Ansaari”, "Rehmani", "Deendaar", "Cheembay" and “Muslim Shiekh” clans are present there too, even though they are much less in number if compared to the major clans. Most of them live in harmony with each other. The village has often witnessed certain fights among different communities or within a same community, however the ratio of peace and compassion is much higher in the village in comparison to the neighbouring villages in the area.

Sectarian division
Five decades ago almost all the village related to Hanfi sect or "Ahlay Sunnat". However, one person from the "Ansari" clan went to get religious knowledge and when he returned he had chosen "Ahl-e-Hadith" sect. He became the priest at the village mosque and he started telling people to adopt the sect he had adopted. Within a short span of time he gathered some people form Bhatti, Awan and Rehmani clans as his followers. Along with these two sects there came Syeds after migrating from Indian Kashmir. They were "Shia". A family from Waseer clan was attracted to Ahmadiyya sect. So now at the moment there live in the village people following "Ahl-e-Sunnat", "Ahl-e-Hadith", "Shia" and Ahmadies preachings.

Land
The village officially owns 700 acres of land. Until last four decades most of the land was futile. Today almost all the land has been turned cultivatable with the help of fertilizers, modern agricultural machinery and people’s ever increasing desire for cultivating more and more land. Along with this officially declared land, some of which is in the possession of the people from other villages, the farmers acquire cultivatable lands on lease at various other places too. The number of acres taken on lease varies from year to year. The average of leased land in the last five years comes to 400 acres annually which is increasing with every passing year.

Education
Education ratio in the village compared to the rest of the region is quite appreciable. Almost more than half of the population of the village is educated and bears much interest in intellectual debate and controversy. However the next generation in the village is quite better. Almost ninety percent of the children attend school and their parents show much dedication in providing them Higher education also. In the village there are more than ten people having passed Master's degree in various subjects, twenty people with a graduation and professional degree and quite a lot above matriculation. It is becoming a kind of obsession among the villagers to send their children to Lahore for college education, while there is a Degree college in the nearby city, Nankana Sahib. At the moment more than ten youngsters are attending different colleges at Lahore while many are studying at their own district degree college, Govt. Gurunanak college, Nankana Sahib.
Women education is also becoming more and more prevalent and appreciated in the village, which once was understood as a curse, some twenty to thirty years ago. A young girl of Bhatti clan broke the ice of getting higher education which encouraged the next generation of girls. Now many girls are looking for getting higher education with the view of becoming more useful and responsible next generation citizens of the country.

Professional education
The people of Kalibair at the moment are well equipped with professional education. Most of the students are testing their talent in various professional fields. The majority has chosen education as their profession. They are working as Elementary and Secondary school teachers in government schools. More than five people have gone in the field of Civil Engineering. They are working for private organisations and one is running his own business. Many people have attended classes in Nursing and Hospitalisation. They are at job at Lahore in various government and private hospitals. Six persons from Waseer Clan two male three female are doing jobs in Education department,One is in revenue department (Patwari). One person from Waseer clan has done master in commerce and doing job in textile as Manager. One person from the village has done B.Sc.Hons. in food technology and currently is serving as Lecturer at TEVTA (Technical education and Vocational training Authority) Punjab University Lahore. Just a year or two ago one person from Syed Clan passed Graduation at Law (L.L.B.) and is in practice at District courts Mirpur, Azad Kashmir. Along with these notable persons, there are many young persons in the fields of Commerce, Accounting, Computer Sciences, Agriculture, Driving, Language, Literature, Banking and Mass communication.

Jobs
A few decades in the past the villagers mainly lived on agriculture only. The people who had many pieces of land were financially good, however the rest of the population was living at or below the poverty line. This poverty would often force the people to take short cuts for getting money which would lead them to criminal activities, like stealing, selling wine(Selling and purchasing of alcohol is illegal in Pakistan), robbery etc. However in the recent years many people from the village moved to nearby cities, some even to the distant business hubs of Pakistan Lahore and Karachi. Some even went abroad. Now Kalibair people are in U.A.E, Saudi Arabia, Hong Kong and Malaysia. This changed the financial map of the village and people returned to jobs and businesses to get rid of the acute poverty they had been facing for years.

Army and police services
Many people of Kalibair have been and are in Army and Police departments. Due to the hard life led by the villagers, the people are natural athletes and physically quite tough. Some people of the village have been serving among the special services group(SSG)in Pakistan Army. Before Partition of India people from this village have been selected for Indian Army to fight in World War I and World War II on Berman and Japanese borders. One person from Syed clan has been taken as prisoner in 1971 Indo-Pak war. Until recent years this area has also been selected for the War exercise of Pakistan Army. 
The village people also have a record of being preferred for the Punjab Police. At the moment three people are in service for the Punjab Police and Elite Force. It might be interesting to note that instead of being thought ways on how to combat crime, the people of this village always find some way to engage in criminal activity, even after a hundred or so people gave acquired posts in the government and law enforcement institutions.

Notes

Populated places in Nankana Sahib District